Opharus laudia is a moth of the family Erebidae. It was described by Herbert Druce in 1890. It is found in Trinidad and Venezuela.

References

Opharus
Moths described in 1890
Moths of the Caribbean
Moths of South America